Benjamin Rucker (June 6, 1889 – April 15, 1934) was an American stage magician, better known by his stage name Black Herman. He was the most prominent African-American magician of his time.

He appears as a major character in Ishmael Reed's 1972 novel Mumbo-Jumbo.

Early life
He was born Benjamin Rucker in Amherst, Virginia on June 6, 1889.

Black Herman learned the art of staged illusions from a performer called Prince Herman, who was first his teacher and later his partner.

Career
The two sold patent medicine as well as performing prestidigitation, making their act as much a medicine show as a stage show. When Prince Herman died, in 1909, Rucker, then only 17 years old, took the name "Black Herman" in his friend's honour and continued to tour, focusing on the stage act and dropping the medicine show aspects of his performance.

Eventually, Herman made Harlem, New York City his home base. Jim Crow policies were in effect at that time, so in the Northern states he could perform before racially mixed audiences, but when he traveled through the South, often with his own tent show, segregation laws kept his audiences primarily black.  His specialties included the Asrah levitation, the production of rabbits, release from knots tied by audience members, and a "buried alive" act which began with his interment in an outdoor area called "Black Herman's Private Graveyard" and continued three days later with his exhumation, revival and a walk to the stage venue, where he performed the rest of his show.

Publication
Herman was the ostensible author of Secrets of Magic, Mystery, and Legerdemain, published in 1925 that contains his semi-fictionalized autobiography, directions for simple illusions suitable to the novice stage magician, advice on astrology and lucky numbers, and a sampling of African-American hoodoo folk magic customs and practices. An announcement on the book's title page, "Black Herman Comes Through Every Seven Years", referred to Herman's pattern of returning to venues on a regular basis; the book was sold at his performances.

Death
Black Herman died on April 15, 1934 at age 44, in Louisville, Kentucky, presumably the result of a heart attack. Despite sensational stories saying Herman died after collapsing during his show, press reports and Herman's own death certificate indicate that he died at a boarding house he and his troupe were staying at in Louisville. Due to the fame of his "buried alive" act, many people refused to believe he was really dead, and thus it came about that his assistant, Washington Reeves, charged admission to view Rucker's corpse at the funeral home, bringing a dramatic close to a life spent in showmanship. He was buried in the Woodlawn Cemetery in Bronx, New York City.

Publication
Black Herman's Secrets of Magic-Mystery & Legerdemain (1925) and republished many times

References

Further reading
Black Herman [Benjamin Rucker]. Secrets of Magic, Mystery, and Legerdemain. 1925. Republished in 1938 first by Empire Publishing, then by Dorene Publishing. This book was ghost-written by Mr. Young, who is also presumed to be the author pseudonymously known as Lewis de Claremont.
Haskins, Jim and Kathleen Benson, Conjure Times, Walker & Co., New York, 2001.
Patton, George. Black Jack: A Drama of Magic, Mystery and Legerdemain, Bloomington, IN: iUniverse, 2009.
Reed, Ishmael. Mumbo-Jumbo'', New York: Doubleday, 1972.

19th-century births
1934 deaths
People from Amherst, Virginia
African-American male actors
American magicians
Vaudeville performers
Deaths onstage
Burials at Woodlawn Cemetery (Bronx, New York)
American male stage actors
20th-century African-American people